Virginie Pichet (born 28 January 1983) is a retired French tennis player.
 
In her career, she won seven singles and five doubles titles on the ITF Women's Circuit. On 21 June 2004, she reached her best singles ranking of world No. 120. On 22 June 2009, she peaked at No. 239 in the doubles rankings.

Pichet, who started playing tennis at the age of seven, competed in the main draw of the French Open in singles 2003, 2004, 2006, and in doubles in 2003, 2004, 2005, 2006, 2007, 2008 she lost her first round.

Virginie Pichet retired from tennis 2014.

ITF finals

Singles: 22 (7–15)

Doubles: 12 (5–7)

External links

 
 

1983 births
Living people
French female tennis players
21st-century French women